Dinesh Rai (born 21 November 1989) is an Indian cricketer. He made his first-class debut for Sikkim in the 2018–19 Ranji Trophy on 6 December 2018. He made his List A debut on 8 October 2019, for Sikkim in the 2019–20 Vijay Hazare Trophy. He made his Twenty20 debut on 9 November 2019, for Sikkim in the 2019–20 Syed Mushtaq Ali Trophy.

References

External links
 

1989 births
Living people
Indian cricketers
Place of birth missing (living people)
Sikkim cricketers